Phragmomphalina tenuiseptum is a species of sea snail, a marine gastropod mollusk in the family Solariellidae.

Description
The diameter of the shell attains 17 mm.

Distribution
This marine species is endemic to New Zealand and occurs off the Three Kings Rise at depths between 780 m and 790 m.

References

 Williams, S.T., Kano, Y., Warén, A. & Herbert, D.G. (2020). Marrying molecules and morphology: first steps towards a reevaluation of solariellid genera (Gastropoda: Trochoidea) in the light of molecular phylogenetic studies. Journal of Molluscan Studies 86 (1): 1–26.

External links
 Marshall B.A. (1999). A revision of the Recent Solariellinae (Gastropoda: Trochoidea) of the New Zealand region. The Nautilus 113(1): 4-42

tenuiseptum
Gastropods of New Zealand
Gastropods described in 1999